The Government of Balochistan is the provincial government of the largest province of Balochistan, Pakistan in Quetta. The head of the province is the Governor, who is nominated by the President of Pakistan. The chief executive of the Government of Balochistan is the Chief Minister who is elected by the Balochistan Assembly and the administrative boss of the province is the Chief Secretary of Balochistan who is appointed by the Prime Minister of Pakistan.

The province of Balochistan in Pakistan contains most of historical Balochistan and is named after the Baloch. Neighbouring regions are Iranian Balochistan to the west, Afghanistan and Federally Administered Tribal Areas, Pakistan to the north and Punjab and Sindh to the east. To the south is the Arabian Sea. The principal languages in the province are Balochi, Pashto, Brahui, and Persian.

Personnel

Executive of Balochistan 
The government of Balochistan consists of 26 Departments and some allied offices.  These 26 Departments are headed by Provincial Secretaries.  The Provincial Secretaries are headed by Chief Secretary Balochistan. Presently there are 18 Ministers who look after 27 Departments.
 Agricultural & Cooperatives
 Chief Minister's Inspection Team
 Communication Works, Physical Planning and Housing
 Culture, Tourism and Archives
 Education
 Environment, Sports and Youth Affairs
 Finance
 Fisheries
 Forest and Wildlife
 Religious Affairs and Interfaith Harmony
 Health
 Home & Tribal Affairs
 Industries and Commerce
 Information
 Board of Revenue
 Irrigation
 Labour and Manpower
 Law & Parliamentary Affairs
 Livestock and Dairy Development Department (LDDD)
 Local Government and Rural Development
 Mines and Minerals
 Planning and Development
 Population Welfare
 Energy Department
 Prosecution
 Provincial Disaster and Management Authority
 Provincial Transport Authority
 Science and Information Technology
 Services and General Administration
 Social Welfare, Special Education, Literacy/ Non-Formal Education and Human Rights
 Civil Defence
 Urban Planning and Development
 Excise, Taxation & Anti-Narcotics
 Women Development Department
 Printing & Stationery
 Balochistan Police

Autonomous Bodies 
 Balochistan Development Authority
 Quetta Development Authority
 Gwadar Development Authority
 Balochistan Public Service Commission
 Balochistan Technical Education & Voccational Training Authority

Legislature

Balochistan's provincial assembly consists of 65 members out of which 11 seats are reserved for women while 3 are reserved for minorities.

See also 
 Balochistan Assembly
 Chief Minister of Balochistan
 Balochistan
 Quetta, Provincial capital of Balochistan

References

External links 
 Government of Balochistan - Official site
 District Database - Government of Balochistan

 
Provincial Governments of Pakistan